
Year 828 (DCCCXXVIII) was a leap year starting on Wednesday (link will display the full calendar) of the Julian calendar.

Events 
 By place 

 Byzantine Empire 
 Siege of Syracuse: The Muslims under Asad ibn al-Furat defeat a Byzantine relief army sent from Palermo, and backed by a Venetian fleet led by Giustiniano Participazio. Al-Furat decides to break off the siege at Syracuse, as his forces suffer greatly from lack of food. Later he dies during an outbreak of an epidemic. 
 Summer – Euphemius, Byzantine admiral, is murdered by emissaries from the Byzantine garrison at Castrogiovanni, which is besieged by the Muslims. Threatened by Byzantine reinforcements arriving from Constantinople, the survivors burn their ships and retreat overland westward to Mazara del Vallo.Vasiliev (1935), pp. 83–84. 

 Europe 
 Al-Andalus: The city of Merida (modern Spain) rises twice in one year against the Umayyad Emirate.
 Kydonia, on the northwest coast of Crete, is destroyed by Saracen pirates (approximate date).
 Alcamo in Sicily is founded by the Muslim commander al-Kamuk (approximate date).

 China 
 In the capital of Chang'an, a powerful court eunuch orders 50 wrestlers to arrest 300 commoners over a land property dispute in Northwest Chang'an, whereupon a riot breaks out in the streets.

 North America 
 The occupation of Pueblo Bonito begins.

 By topic 

 Religion 
 Relics of Mark the Evangelist are stolen from Alexandria (controlled by the Abbasid Caliphate) by two Venetian merchants, and brought to Venice.
 At the instigation of Adalram, archbishop of Salzburg, the first Christian church in Central and Eastern Europe is built in Nitra, Pannonia.
 A Coptic revolt breaks out in Egypt (approximate date).

Births 
 Ali al-Hadi, 10th Shia Imam
 Al-Dinawari, astronomer and grammarian (d. 889)
 Carloman of Bavaria, Frankish king (or 830)
 Ibn Qutaybah, Muslim scholar (d. 889)
 Yantou Quanhuo, Chinese Chan master (d. 887)

Deaths 
 Asad ibn al-Furat, Muslim jurist and theologian (b. 759)
 Euphemius, Byzantine admiral and usuper
 Ibn Hisham, Muslim historian (or 833)
 Idriss II, Muslim emir of Morocco (b. 791) 
 Nikephoros I, patriarch of Constantinople
 Talha ibn Tahir, Muslim governor

References